1921 Persian coup d'état, known in Iran as 3 Esfand 1299 coup d'état ( with the Solar Hijri date), refers to several major events in Persia in 1921, which eventually led to the establishment of the Pahlavi dynasty as the ruling house of the country in 1925.

The events began with a coup by the Persian Cossack Brigade headed by Reza Khan on 21 February 1921. The precise level of British involvement in Reza Khan's coup remains a matter of historical debate, but it is almost certain that Edmund Ironside provided advice to the plotters. With this coup Zia'eddin Tabatabaee took over power and became Prime Minister. The coup was largely bloodless and faced little resistance. With his expanded forces and the Cossack Brigade, Reza Khan launched successful military actions to eliminate separatist and dissident movements in Tabriz, Mashhad and the Jangalis in Gilan. The campaign against Simko and the Kurds was less successful and lasted well into 1922, though eventually concluding with Persian success.

Background
In late 1920, the Persian Soviet Socialist Republic in Rasht was preparing to march on Tehran with "a guerrilla force of 1,500 Jangalis, Kurds, Armenians and Azerbaijanis", reinforced by the Bolsheviks' Red Army. This fact, along with various other disorders, mutinies and unrest in the country created "an acute political crisis in the capital."

By 1921, the ruling Qajar dynasty of Persia had become corrupt and inefficient. The oil-rich nation was somewhat reliant on the nations of Britain and Russia for military and economic support. Civil wars earlier in the decade had threatened the government, and the only regular military force at the time was the Cossack Brigade.

The Qajar shah in 1921 was Ahmad, who had been crowned at the age of eleven. He was considered to be a weak, incompetent ruler, especially after British, Russian and Ottoman occupations of Persia during World War I. In 1911, when the capital city, Tehran, had been seized by the Russians, armed Bakhtiaris tribesmen, rather than Iranian regular troops, expelled the invaders. This further diminished the government's reputation, rendering it almost powerless in time of war.

Britain, which played a major role in Persia, was perturbed by the Qajar government's inability to rule efficiently. This inefficiency was the background of a power struggle between Britain and Soviet Russia, each nation hoping to control Persia.

On 14 January 1921, the British General Edmund Ironside chose to promote Reza Khan, who had been leading the Tabriz battalion, to lead the entire brigade. About a month later, under British direction, Reza Khan's 3,000-4,000 strong detachment of the Cossack Brigade reached Tehran.

The coup and subsequent events

Reza Khan seizes Tehran
On 18 February 1921 the Cossacks reached Tehran meeting little resistance. In the early morning of 21 February they entered the city. Only several policemen, taken by surprise, are said to had been killed or wounded in the center of Tehran. Backed by his troops, Reza Khan forced the government to dissolve and oversaw his own appointment as minister of war. Reza Khan also ensured that Ahmad, still ruling as shah, appoint Sayyed Ziaoddin Tabatabaee as prime minister.

Treaty with the USSR
On 26 February the new government signed a treaty of friendship with the Union of Soviet Socialist Republics, formerly the Russian Empire. As a result of the treaty, the Soviet Union gave up some of its former Russian facilities in Iran, although the Soviet diplomats ensured that their nation was allowed to intervene with its military in Iran, as long as the intervention was "self-defense". The USSR also gave up any Russian-owned railroads and ports in Iran.

Change of prime ministers
Prior to the coup, Ahmad Qavam, governor of Khorasan, had asserted his loyalty to the Qajar regime. When he refused to recognize the government installed by Reza Khan, he was jailed in Tehran. During his imprisonment, Gavam cultivated a hatred of the man who had arrested him, Colonel Mohammad Taghi Pessian, now the gendarmerie chief.

Sayyed Ziaoddin Tabatabaee, who had been installed as prime minister, was removed from office on 25 May by Shah Ahmad's decree. Shortly afterward, Qavam was released from prison and given Tabatabaee's former post. Colonel Pessian refused to accept this betrayal of the coup's ideals of a democratic Iran and began to gather popular support and many tribes flocked to make up his formidable force.

Quelling local uprisings

Pessian's revolt
After Gavam was made prime minister, one of the coup leaders and now the gendarmerie chief Colonel Mohammad Taghi Pessian opposed the new order and erosion of the democratic principles for which he and many of his fellow Iranians had fought and so departed Tehran. Soon at the head of a rebel army, Pessian went to battle with the armies of several regional governors. However, the rebels were eventually defeated and Reza Khan ordered that Pessian be beheaded and that the head be returned to Tehran and put on display to prove that Pessian, now a national hero, was dead to quell further rebellions. The Kurds of Khorasan also revolted in the same year.

Gilan campaign
The campaign on the Republic of Gilan was taken in early July 1921, by the main Cossack force, led by Vsevolod Starosselsky. Following a gendarme operation, led by Habibollah Khan (Shiabani), they cleared up Mazandaran and moved into Gilan. On 20 August, ahead of the arrival of the Cossacks, the insurgents pulled out of Rasht, retreating towards Enzeli. The Cossacks entered Rasht on 24 August. Though further pursuit after the revolutionaries turned successful at Khomam and Pirbazar, they have become heavily assaulted later on by the Soviet fleet, which bombed them by heavy artillery fire. First, it had been believed that the entire force of 700 men, led by Reza Khan, became annihilated in this event, though later the actual casualty rate was determined to be about 10%, with the rest of them scattering upon the bombardment. As a result, Starosselski ordered evacuation of Rasht.

The Soviet Republic of Gilan officially came to an end in September 1921. Mirza and his German friend Gauook (Hooshang) were left alone in the Khalkhal Mountains, and died of frostbite.

Kurdish revolt

Aftermath

In the aftermath of 1921 events, relations of Persian government with the Sheikhdom of Mohammerah had also become strained. In 1924, Sheikh Khazal rebellion broke out in Khuzestan, being the first modern Arab nationalist uprising led by the Sheikh of Mohammerah Khaz'al al-Ka'bi. The rebellion was quickly and effectively suppressed with minimal casualties.

Rezā Khan was placed on the throne by constitutional assembly in 1925, and many of those involved in the coup were either killed or put in prison. One General, Sepahbod Amir Ahmadi, tried to stand up against the establishment of a new monarchy, but on a visit to his now imprisoned brother-in-law, General Heydargholi Pessian, who had been one of the leaders of the coup that defeated the Qajar dynasty, Amir Ahmadi  confessed that his efforts to prevent Reza Khan being made Shah and the monarchy reinstated were being thwarted by the British. Reza Khan was finally declared Shah, taking the surname Pahlavi and thus founding the Pahlavi dynasty. The Pahlavis ruled in Iran until the revolution of 1979, when the government was toppled and replaced with that of the Islamic Republic of Iran, headed by Ruhollah Khomeini. The day after the Shah left Iran, the revolutionary leaders declared Colonel Mohammad Taghi Pessian the first Martyr of the Revolution although Pessian was a Secularist.

See also
 Persian Constitutional Revolution (1905–1907)
 Iran crisis of 1946
 Iranian Revolution (1979)
 List of modern conflicts in the Middle East

References

External links
  THE PERSIAN COUP D'ETAT (1921), Advocate of Peace through Justice. Vol. 88, No. 2 (FEBRUARY, 1926), pp. 86-88
 COUP D’ETAT OF 1921. Encyclopedia Iranica
 PERSIAN OOUP D'ETAT. Kalgoorlie Miner, Saturday 26 February 1921, page 5

Rebellions in Iran
Foreign relations of the Soviet Union
Iran–Soviet Union relations
Pahlavi Iran
Persian
Persian crisis of 1921
Persian crisis in 1921
Persian crisis of 1921
Iran crisis of 1921
Iranian civil wars
Military coups in Iran
Military operations involving the Soviet Union
Politics of Qajar Iran
February 1921 events
1920s coups d'état and coup attempts